Axin-1 is a protein that in humans is encoded by the AXIN1 gene.

Function 

This gene encodes a cytoplasmic protein which contains a regulation of G-protein signaling (RGS) domain and a dishevelled and axin (DIX) domain. The encoded protein interacts with adenomatosis polyposis coli, catenin (cadherin-associated protein) beta 1, glycogen synthase kinase 3 beta, protein phosphatase 2, and itself. This protein functions as a negative regulator of the wingless-type MMTV integration site family, member 1 (WNT) signaling pathway and can induce apoptosis. The crystal structure of a portion of this protein, alone and in a complex with other proteins, has been resolved. Mutations in this gene have been associated with hepatocellular carcinoma, hepatoblastomas, ovarian endometrioid adenocarcinomas, and medulloblastomas. Two transcript variants encoding distinct isoforms have been identified for this gene.

The AXIN proteins attract substantial interest in cancer research as AXIN1 and AXIN2 work synergistically to control pro-oncogenic β-catenin signaling. Importantly, activity in the β-catenin destruction complex can be increased by tankyrase inhibitors and are a potential therapeutic option to reduce the growth of β-catenin-dependent cancers.

Structure 

The full-length human protein comprises 862 amino acids with a (predicted) molecular mass of 96 kDa. The N-terminal RGS domain, a GSK3 kinase interacting peptide of Axin1 and homologs of the C-terminal DIX domains have been solved at atomic resolution. Large WNT-downregulating central regions have been characterized as intrinsically disordered by biophysical experiments and bioinformatic analysis. Biophysical destabilization of the folded RGS domain induces formation of nanoaggregates that expose and locally concentrate intrinsically disordered regions, which in turn misregulate Wnt signalling. Many other large IDPs (Intrinsically Disordered Proteins) are affected by missense mutations, such as BRCA1, Adenomatous polyposis coli, CREB-binding protein/(CBP) and might be affected in similar ways by missense mutations of their folded domains.

Interactions 

AXIN1 has been shown to interact with:

 APC, 
 CTNNB1, 
 CSNK1E, 
 CSNK1A1, 
 DVL1, 
 GSK3B, 
 LRP5, 
 MAP3K1, 
 PPP2R5A, 
 RNF43, and
 TSC2.

References

Further reading

External links